Founded in 1969, Software AG is an enterprise software company with over 10,000 enterprise customers in over 70 countries. The company is the second largest software vendor in Germany, and the seventh largest in Europe. Software AG is traded on the Frankfurt Stock Exchange under the symbol “SOW” and part of the technology index TecDAX.

History
The company was founded in 1969 by six young employees at the consulting firm AIV (Institut für Angewandte Informationsverarbeitung). One of the founders was the mathematician Peter Schnell, who later became chairman of the board for many years. ADABAS was launched in 1971 as a high-performance transactional database management system. In 1979, Natural, a 4GL application development English-like language, that was mainly developed by Peter Pagé, was launched. The company continued to open offices and subsidiaries in North America (1971), Japan (1974), UK (1977), France (1983), Spain (1984), Switzerland, Austria, Belgium, and Saudi Arabia (1985). By 1987, Software AG had around 500 employees, 12 subsidiaries in Europe and offices in more than 50 countries. In 1999, Software AG was listed on Frankfurt Stock Exchange and soon after the company released Tamino Information Server and Tamino XML Server.

In January 2005, Software AG acquired Sabratec Ltd, a privately held legacy integration vendor headquartered in Israel. This was followed by the acquisition of its Israeli distributor SPL Software in March 2007 and the application modernization business of another Israeli company, Jacada in December 2007, which formed the basis for its research and development center in Israel.

The company launched Centrasite SOA Governance platform in 2006 and with the $546M acquisition of U.S. rival webMethods in 2007 Software AG became one of the leaders in enterprise service bus, business process management and service-oriented architecture (SOA) product space.

In July 2009, Software AG announced a takeover offer for the Germany-based company IDS Scheer AG. Since February 2010, IDS Scheer is part of the Software AG Group. In October 2010, the company acquired New Jersey based Data Foundations, a leading master data management provider.

In May 2011, Software AG acquired Terracotta, Inc. and Metismo Ltd.
Terracotta Inc is a leader in the field of in-memory technology for high-performance applications and cloud services. Especially the middleware platform WebMethods should benefit from this acquisition.
Metismo Ltd. has an extremely flexible and versatile platform for the development of device-independent mobile applications. It enables the design and development of applications and the automatic transformation in the different formats of mobile devices.

In April 2012, Software AG announced buying the British technology provider my-Channels.
With My-Channels, Software AG gained in-house access to universal messaging technology that allowed the company to transfer their data streams quickly and safely to the cloud and mobile applications.

In March 2013, Software AG invested in Berlin-based company metaquark, which is specialized in mobile software. The aim is to jointly develop the webMethods Mobile Suite.

In April 2013, Software AG bought the US cloud platform provider LongJump. The platform as a service offers modules and templates for building and running business applications in the public or private cloud settings.

On June 13, 2013, Software AG acquired alfabet AG. Alfabet is a software provider of enterprise architecture and IT portfolio management.

On June 13, 2013 Software AG announced purchased the Apama Complex Event Processing platform of Progress Software. The platform provides an environment for the design and operation of CEP applications providing tools and graphical analysis and test capabilities for analysts, developers and administrators.

Software AG acquired JackBe in August 2013 to serve as the foundation for its Intelligent Business Operations Platform, which provides analytics and decision management for real-time applications.

In December 2013, Software AG invested in big data analytics company Datameer, which offers self-service Big Data Analytics and "to follow cutting edge technology trends".

On March 27, 2017 Software AG announced the acquisition of Cumulocity GmbH, based in Düsseldorf, Germany.

On June 12, 2018 Software AG acquired the Belgian self-service analytics company, TrendMiner NV. TrendMiner specializes in visual data analytics for the manufacturing and process industry.

Corruption allegations
In July 2017 allegations emerged in South Africa that Software AG made "kickback" payments by entering into questionable commission agreements with a Gupta-controlled company in the hope of securing lucrative state contracts.
"Software AG [launched] an internal investigation after a media report alleged it had paid kickbacks as part of a wide-ranging South African scandal..."

Acquisitions

Products
Software AG markets software products in technologies like DBMS, application modernization, SOA, BPMS and ESB. Below are a few of their products on the market.
 ADABAS – a high performance transactional database management system
 Alfabet – IT Planning, Portfolio Management, and Enterprise Architecture Software
 Apama – Platform for streaming analytics and intelligent automated action on fast-moving big data. Combines event processing, messaging, in-memory data management and visualization.
 ARIS – acquired business process analysis platform. A free version is available as ARIS Express.
 Centrasite – a flagship SOA governance application which provides UDDI as well as governance
 CONNX - Data Access, Data Movement (ETL), Streaming Analytics 
 Cumulocity – an Internet of Things (IoT) platform that provides services for connectivity for networked digital devices and sensors
 Natural – an English-like fourth-generation programming language for application development
 NaturalONE - Eclipse-based integrated development environment natural applications
 Presto – Self-service, real-time data visualization and exploration tool combines data from different applications to create mashups, which can be displayed on any device.
 Tamino Information Server – Information server based on XML for the storage, management and transfer of structured and unstructured data, now called webMethods Tamino
 Terracotta, Inc. – Company behind opensource Ehcache. Big memory, Quartz scheduler are their primary products. My-Channel's Nirvana messaging is now offered as Terracotta Universal Messaging.
 webMethods – an ESB, API Management, BPMS, SOA enablement, MDM and B2B integration
Cumulocity IoT - an IoT product, providing hardware, Cloud and Edge Services as well as platforms adaptable to the Software AG Cloud

Communities
Software AG uses two main customer communities: the ARIS Community, for the user group around ARIS, and the TECHcommunity, for collaboration around Cumulocity IoT, Adabas & Natural, webMethods, Apama, Alfabet, TrendMiner. 
In August 2021 Software AG introduced its virtual platform Software AG Groups where developers and customers can connect, collaborate, learn and share ideas. 

The Software AG University Relations Program organizes events and features free education packages that are self-explanatory, easy to use and made for remote learning. In an effort to built an academic user group, students gain free access to software, video tutorials and online training with the option to get certified upon completion.

References

 
Companies listed on the Frankfurt Stock Exchange
Software companies established in 1969
Companies based in Hesse
Software companies of Germany
Companies in the TecDAX
Companies in the MDAX